Terthreutis combesae is a species of moth of the family Tortricidae. It is found in Thailand.

The wingspan is about 25 mm. The ground colour of the forewings is cream, suffused with yellowish brown, and strigulated (finely streaked) with pale yellowish brown. The markings are yellowish brown. The hindwings are cream, slightly tinged with yellowish brown.

Etymology
The species is named after Jenny Combes, the wife of lepidopterist Kevin Tuck.

References

Moths described in 2008
Archipini
Moths of Asia